James Ben Preston (born 24 September 1963) is a British journalist. He is an executive editor of The Sunday Times and a former editor of the Radio Times.

Early life
His father was Peter Preston, editor of The Guardian from 1975–95, and his wife Jean Burrell; he has a brother and two sisters. Preston attended Alleyn's School in Dulwich, London. At the University of Bristol he studied Politics. He gained an MA in journalism from London's City University.

Career
He began his career in 1987, working on local newspapers (Bristol Evening Post). He worked later for the Press Association as education correspondent before joining The Times. He was The Times deputy editor from 2000 to 2008 and Acting Editor for nine months. Subsequently, he was Executive Editor at The Independent from 2008.

On 17 June 2009, it was announced that he had been appointed as Editor of Radio Times. He was awarded Editors' Editor in the 2016 BSME awards. He remained at the Radio Times until early 2017. In March 2017, it was announced that he had been appointed as an Executive Editor of The Sunday Times.

Personal life
Preston is married to The Times columnist Janice Turner. He is a cyclist and a Millwall supporter. He lives in Camberwell, and has two sons.

References

External links
 Twitter

1963 births
Living people
Alumni of the University of Bristol
BBC people
British magazine editors
People educated at Alleyn's School
People from Crosby, Merseyside
People from East Dulwich
Ben
Alumni of City, University of London
The Times journalists